Beloved Imposter is a 1936 British musical film directed by Victor Hanbury and starring Rene Ray, Fred Conyngham and Germaine Aussey. It was made at Welwyn Studios and released as a quota film by RKO Pictures. It was based on the novel Dancing Boy by Ethel Mannin.

Cast
 Rene Ray as Mary 
 Fred Conyngham as George 
 Germaine Aussey as La Lumiere 
 Charles Oliver as Pierre 
 Penelope Parkes as Connie 
 Edwin Ellis as Herbert 
 Fred Groves as Jack Harding 
 Bela Mila as Mona 
 Tony De Lungo as Govani 
 Laurence Hanray as Arthur 
 Leslie 'Hutch' Hutchinson as Pianist 
 Gwen Farrar as Singer 
 Sidney Culver as Horace 
 Phil Thomas as Hodges 
 Quentin McPhearson as Mr. Watts 
 Reginald Long as Mr. Sladen 
 Dino Galvani as Manager of Cabaret 
 Scott Harrold as Davis 
 Billy Wells as Policeman 
 Bruno Barnabe as Policeman

References

Bibliography
 Chibnall, Steve. Quota Quickies: The British of the British 'B' Film. British Film Institute, 2007.
 Low, Rachael. Filmmaking in 1930s Britain. George Allen & Unwin, 1985.
 Wood, Linda. British Films, 1927-1939. British Film Institute, 1986.

External links

1936 films
British musical comedy films
British black-and-white films
1936 musical comedy films
Films directed by Victor Hanbury
Films shot at Welwyn Studios
Films based on British novels
Films scored by Jack Beaver
1930s English-language films
1930s British films